Shin In-Seob (born 1 June  1989) also written as Inseob Shin, is a South Korean footballer currently playing for FC Pocheon in the K3 League, the fourth tier of South Korean football.

Biography

Early life
Shin In-Seob was first introduced to football at the age of 7, when his family moved to England. He returned to South Korea five years later.

Club career

At an early stage of his career, Shin was given the opportunity to go on trial with the Crystal Palace Youth Academy for a 5-month period.

Shin's first trial appearance in Adelaide United's line-up came on June 16, 2009 in a friendly against South Australian Super League side, Raiders. He again started for Adelaide on June 26, in the club's first friendly against A-League opposition for 2009, Perth Glory. On June 29, Shin signed his first professional contract with Adelaide United since leaving Konkuk University where he played in the Korean University League.

Shin was set to play his first A-League match in Adelaide United's season opener on August 7, 2009; but was unable to do so as his international clearance had not been processed in time for the match. As of August 11, 2009, Shin's international transfer certificate has been received by Football Federation Australia and he is therefore registered to play in A-League matches as of Round 2 of the 2009–10 season.

Shin made his professional debut as a substitute in Adelaide United's loss to Sydney FC on August 16, 2009. He scored his first goal in a Youth League match against Melbourne Victory on September 18, 2009.

In November 2010, after failing to make an impact at Adelaide, Shin decided to return to South Korea and applied for the 2011 K-League draft. On 9 November 2010, he was successfully drafted to K-League side Busan I'Park as of 2011.

Shin spent 2012 with Chinese side Beijing Baxy where he scored two goals for the first team.
In 2014, he joined Yongin City in the National League, the third tier of South Korean football.

Personal life
As a result of his time in England, Shin is fluent in English as well as his native Korean. Shin revealed that his favourite singer is K-pop artist, Wheesung and his favourite TV Show is Infinite Challenge, a Korean entertainment show, in an interview for an Australian newspaper in 2009.

Career statistics
(Correct as of 7 March 2014)

References

External links
 
 Busan I'Park profile 
 Adelaide United profile

1989 births
Living people
Association football midfielders
South Korean footballers
South Korean expatriate footballers
Adelaide United FC players
Busan IPark players
A-League Men players
K League 1 players
Korea National League players
K3 League players
Expatriate soccer players in Australia
South Korean expatriate sportspeople in Australia
Konkuk University alumni
Footballers from Seoul